Firat Arslan (born 28 September 1970) is a German professional boxer of Turkish descent who held the WBA cruiserweight title from 2007 to 2008. He also challenged twice for the WBO cruiserweight title in 2012 and 2014 and once for the IBF cruiserweight title in 2014

Professional career
Southpaw Arslan began his professional career in 1997 and won his first 13 fights with aggressive brawling before dropping back to back decisions to Collice Mutizwa and Rüdiger May.
His biggest success in the early phase of his career was a draw against unbeaten Russian Vadim Tokarev in 2003 but he lost his next fight to Czech Lubos Suda.
In 2005 he beat local hero Alexander Petkovic and his career picked up momentum. His big breakthrough was entirely unexpected, though, as he managed to not only dominate but also KO unbeaten Russian fringe contender Grigory Drozd.
For that he got a title shot in July 2007 and captured the interim WBA cruiserweight title with a split decision win over yet another Russian in Valery Brudov.  Later that year he bested 43-year-old Virgil Hill for the WBA title. He beat contender Darnell Wilson on 3 May 2008 in Germany by unanimous decision.

He lost his title against Panamanian Guillermo Jones in Hamburg, on 27 September 2008, one day before his birthday.  After the loss to Jones, Arslan took an extended leave from boxing and returned almost two years later to face unheralded Steve Hérélius for the interim title.  Arslan was in front but at the end of the 11th round he was unable to continue because of a syncope.

In 2014, Arslan fought Yoan Pablo Hernandez for a chance to take Hernandez's cruiserweight belt, but lost in a tightly contested match with scores of: 115–113, 116–113, and 113–115.

Professional boxing record

{|class="wikitable" style="text-align:center; font-size:95%"
|-
!
!Result
!Record
!Opponent
!Type
!Round, time
!Date
!Location
!Notes

|-
|61
|Win
|50-9-3
|style="text-align:left;"| Alejandro Barrio
|KO
|4 (12), 
|2021-12-04
|style="text-align:left;"| 
|style="text-align:left;"|
|-
|60
|Win
|49-9-3
|style="text-align:left;"| Ruben Eduardo Acosta
|TKO
|4 (12), 
|2021-07-24
|style="text-align:left;"| 
|style="text-align:left;"|
|-
|59
|Win
|48-9-3
|style="text-align:left;"| Gusmyr Pedromo
|KO
|3 (10), 
|2021-03-06
|style="text-align:left;"| 
|
|-
|58
|Loss
|47-9-3
|style="text-align:left;"| Kevin Lerena
|TKO
|6 (12), 
|2020-02-08
|style="text-align:left;"| 
|style="text-align:left;"|
|-
|57
|Win
|47-8-3
|style="text-align:left;"| Sami Enbom
|KO
|3 (10), 
|2019-09-14
|style="text-align:left;"| 
|
|-
|56
|Win
|46-8-3
|style="text-align:left;"| Cesar David Crenz
|KO
|2 (10), 
|2019-06-22
|style="text-align:left;"| 
|
|-
|55
|Win
|45-8-3
|style="text-align:left;"| Ricardo Marcelo Ramallo
|TKO
|3 (12), 
|2019-04-13
|style="text-align:left;"| 
|style="text-align:left;"|
|-
|55
|Draw
|44-8-3
|style="text-align:left;"| Sefer Seferi
|MD
|12
|2018-11-17
|style="text-align:left;"| 
|style="text-align:left;"|
|-
|54
|Win
|44-8-2
|align=left| Pascal Ndomba
|KO
|2 (12), 
|2018-09-22
|align=left|
|align=left|
|-
|53
|Win
|43-8-2
|align=left| Pablo Matias Magrini
|KO
|1 (12), 
|2018-06-16
|align=left|
|align=left|
|-
|52
|Win
|42-8-2
|align=left| Isaac Paa Kwesi Ankrah
|KO
|1 (10), 
|2018-05-19
|align=left|
|align=left|
|-
|51
|Win
|41-8-2
|align=left| Alejandro Emilio Valori
|KO
|7 (10),
|2017-10-07
|align=left|
|align=left|
|-
|50
|Win
|40-8-2
|align=left| Goran Delic
|TKO
|6 (12), 
|2017-07-15
|align=left|
|align=left|
|-
|49
|Win
|39-8-2
|align=left| Gezim Tahiri
|RTD
|2 (10), 
|2017-03-18
|align=left|
|align=left|
|-
|48
|Win
|38-8-2
|align=left| Nuri Seferi
|UD
|12
|2016-09-17
|align=left|
|align=left|
|-
|47
|Win
|37-8-2
|align=left| Claudio Morroni Porto
|KO
|1 (8), 
|2016-06-04
|align=left|
|align=left|
|-
|46
|Win
|36-8-2
|align=left| Paata Aduashvili
|KO
|2 (12), 
|2015-11-07
|align=left|
|align=left|
|-
|45
|Win
|35-8-2
|align=left| Gyula Bozai
|UD
|8
|2015-05-02
|align=left|
|align=left|
|-
|44
|Loss
|34-8-2
|align=left| Yoan Pablo Hernandez
|SD
|12
|2014-08-16
|align=left|
|align=left|
|-
|43
|Win
|34-7-2
|align=left| Tamas Bajzath
|UD
|8
|2014-06-07
|align=left|
|align=left|
|-
|42
|Loss
|33-7-2
|align=left| Marco Huck
|TKO
|6 (12), 
|2014-01-25
|align=left|
|align=left|
|-
|41
|Win
|33-6-2
|align=left| Varol Vekiloglu
|UD
|10
|2013-04-27
|align=left|
|align=left|
|-
|40
|Loss
|32-6-2
|align=left| Marco Huck
|UD
|12
|2012-11-03
|align=left|
|align=left|
|-
|39
|Draw
|32-5-2
|align=left| Aleksandr Alekseyev
|MD
|12
|2012-05-11
|align=left|
|align=left|
|-
|38
|Win
|32-5-1
|align=left| Orlando Antonio Farias
|TKO
|2 (10), 
|2012-01-28
|align=left|
|align=left|
|-
|37
|Win
|31-5-1
|align=left| Lubos Suda
|TKO
|5 (12), 
|2011-07-15
|align=left|
|align=left|
|-
|36
|Win
|30-5-1
|align=left| Michal Bilak
|TKO
|3 (8), 
|2011-04-01
|align=left|
|align=left|
|-
|35
|Loss
|29-5-1
|align=left| Steve Herelius
|RTD
|11 (12), 
|2010-07-03
|align=left|
|align=left|
|-
|34
|Loss
|29-4-1
|align=left| Guillermo Jones
|TKO
|10 (12), 
|2008-09-27
|align=left|
|align=left|
|-
|33
|Win
|29-3-1
|align=left| Darnell Wilson
|UD
|12
|2008-05-03
|align=left|
|align=left|
|-
|32
|Win
|28-3-1
|align=left| Virgil Hill
|UD
|12
|2007-11-24
|align=left|
|align=left|
|-
|31
|Win
|27-3-1
|align=left| Valery Brudov
|SD
|12
|2007-06-16
|align=left|
|align=left|
|-
|30
|Win
|26-3-1
|align=left| Grigory Drozd
|TKO
|5 (12)
|2006-10-28
|align=left|
|align=left|
|-
|29
|Win
|25-3-1
|align=left| Gabor Halasz
|TKO
|2 (12)
|2006-05-23
|align=left|
|align=left|
|-
|28
|Win
|24-3-1
|align=left| Carlos Cruzat
|UD
|12
|2005-11-15
|align=left|
|align=left|
|-
|27
|Win
|23-3-1
|align=left| Wlodek Kopec
|KO
|1 (8), 
|2005-05-28
|align=left|
|align=left|
|-
|26
|Win
|22-3-1
|align=left| Alexander Petkovic
|TKO
|7 (12)
|2005-01-18
|align=left|
|align=left|
|-
|25
|Win
|21-3-1
|align=left| Lee Manuel Ossie
|UD
|10
|2004-07-31
|align=left|
|align=left|
|-
|24
|Win
|20-3-1
|align=left| Marco Heinichen
|KO
|5 (10)
|2004-03-20
|align=left|
|align=left|
|-
|23
|Win
|19-3-1
|align=left| Mircea Telecan
|TKO
|2 (6)
|2004-01-17
|align=left|
|align=left|
|-
|22
|Loss
|18-3-1
|align=left| Lubos Suda
|UD
|12
|2003-12-12 
|align=left|
|align=left|
|-
|21
|Draw
|18-2-1
|align=left| Vadim Tokarev
|PTS
|12
|2003-08-16
|align=left|
|align=left|
|-
|20
|Win
|18-2
|align=left| Bruce Oezbek
|UD
|10
|2003-05-24
|align=left|
|align=left|
|-
|19
|Win
|17-2
|align=left| Mircea Telecan
|TKO
|2 (6)
|2002-09-07
|align=left|
|align=left|
|-
|18
|Win
|16-2
|align=left| Cosmin Pocora
|KO
|1 (4)
|2002-06-15
|align=left|
|align=left|
|-
|17
|Win
|15-2
|align=left| Mihai Iftode
|PTS
|4 (4)
|2002-06-08
|align=left|
|align=left|
|-
|16
|Win
|14-2
|align=left| Mark Hobson
|TKO
|7 (8)
|2001-10-08
|align=left|
|align=left|
|-
|15
|Loss
|13-2
|align=left| Rüdiger May
|UD
|10
|2001-05-19
|align=left|
|align=left|
|-
|14
|Loss
|13-1
|align=left| Collice Mutizwa
|PTS
|6
|2000-12-08
|align=left|
|align=left|
|-
|13
|Win
|13-0
|align=left| Tony Booth
|TKO
|2 (6)
|2000-10-31
|align=left|
|align=left|
|-
|12
|Win
|12-0
|align=left| Chris Woollas
|TKO
|2 (8)
|2000-07-13
|align=left|
|align=left|
|-
|11
|Win
|11-0
|align=left| Yves Monsieur
|KO
|2 (8)
|2000-05-27
|align=left|
|align=left|
|-
|10
|Win
|10-0
|align=left| Zoltan Petranyi
|KO
|3 (6)
|1999-10-16
|align=left|
|align=left|
|-
|9
|Win
|9-0
|align=left| Zoltan Beres
|PTS
|8
|1999-08-21
|align=left|
|align=left|
|-
|8
|Win
|8-0
|align=left| Frantisek Pacalaj
|TKO
|2 (6)
|1999-06-19
|align=left|
|align=left|
|-
|7
|Win
|7-0
|align=left| Zoltan Kovacs
|KO
|1 (6)
|1999-03-27
|align=left|
|align=left|
|-
|6
|Win
|6-0
|align=left| Wesly Dramasky
|KO
|2 (6)
|1998-11-14
|align=left|
|align=left|
|-
|5
|Win
|5-0
|align=left| Patrik Akerlund
|SD
|6 (6)
|1998-07-22
|align=left|
|align=left|
|-
|4
|Win
|4-0
|align=left| Ladislav Olah
|TKO
|2 (6)
|1998-04-21
|align=left|
|align=left|
|-
|3
|Win
|3-0
|align=left| Roman Nikodem
|KO
|2 (6)
|1997-11-29 
|align=left|
|align=left|
|-
|2
|Win
|2-0
|align=left| Kevin Mitchell
|PTS
|4 (4)
|1997-09-02
|align=left|
|align=left|
|-
|1
|Win
|1-0
|align=left| Zsolt Janko
|PTS
|4 (4)
|1997-01-25
|align=left|
|align=left|

See also
List of cruiserweight boxing champions

References

External links

1970 births
Living people
Cruiserweight boxers
World cruiserweight boxing champions
World Boxing Association champions
German people of Turkish descent
German male boxers
People from Aichach-Friedberg
Sportspeople from Swabia (Bavaria)